Unincorporated may refer to:

 Unincorporated area, land not governed by a local municipality
 Unincorporated entity, a type of organization
 Unincorporated territories of the United States, territories under U.S. jurisdiction, to which Congress has determined that only select parts of the U.S. Constitution apply
 Unincorporated association, also known as voluntary association, groups organized to accomplish a purpose
 Unincorporated (album), a 2001 album by Earl Harvin Trio